Two Wells Fargo Center is a  high rise in Charlotte, North Carolina. Completed in 1971.  It is currently the 14th tallest building in Charlotte. The building consists of 32 floors, an atrium, plaza, seven-story parking garage, and is connected to neighboring buildings via skybridges, as part of the Overstreet Mall.

History
The building was designed by LaBella Associates, formerly known as Pease Engineering and Architecture, with David Julian Moore was the architect on-site functioning as construction administrator. 

When completed, the 32-story building was called Jefferson First Union Tower. It became the tallest building in North Carolina, overtaking the Winston Tower in Winston-Salem. The 13th floor contains only equipment and no offices. Later, the building was renamed First Union Plaza.  When First Union employees began moving into the new headquarters in February 1988, that building was called One First Union Center. The name Two First Union Center referred to the 32-story tower, while the term "Two First Union complex" also included a 12-story building next door. 

Since the building was built it has been one of the bank's main buildings, mostly filled with bank employees.  Over the years there have been a few other tenants including Speedway Motorsports leased  in 1998 to house 20 employees, also in 1998 Ruddick Corp., the former owner of Harris Teeter leased space, in 2006 law firm Downer, Walters & Mitchener vacated  on the 17th floor to move to an office on Morehead St, and CIT Group leased space in the building until 2010.  After the merger with Wells Fargo the building along with One Wachovia,  Three Wachovia, and Duke Energy Center became the bank's main buildings in Uptown.

As the bank changed names the buildings were renamed multiple times.  In January 2002 all First Union buildings were took the Wachovia name as a result of First Union purchasing Wachovia.  Two First Union became Two Wachovia Center. In December 2010, as a result of Wells Fargo's 2008 purchase of Wachovia, the building was renamed Two Wells Fargo Center.

In January 2023 Wells Fargo announced it will be exiting One Wells Fargo Center and Two Wells Fargo Center by the end of 2023.  The employees from these two buildings will be consolidated into 550 South Tryon and Three Wells Fargo Center.  After consolidation is complete Wells Fargo will occupy 95% of 550 South Tryon.  The bank will be renovating 21 floors of 550 South Tryon and the food court.  Three Wells Fargo Center will have 14 renovated over the next two to years.  The bank plans to rename both buildings at a later date.

Related buildings
The shorter building in the Two First Union complex was built in 1954 to serve as the headquarters of Union National Bank, later First Union National Bank. The original building was 9 stories; 3 stories were added in the 1960s. The building  was known for its  Charlotte Hornets mural which lasted four years. Wachovia planned to move its 900 employees out of the shorter building by the end of 2003. It was believed to be too outdated to occupy but the decision was made to renovate it instead. The renovation costs were about equal to the cost to rebuild it. Chris Scorsone the lead designer of the renovation with Little Diversified Architectural Consulting said this about it  "We looked at this as just another evolution of the building. The important part of the building was the location, not its style. This is an important part of the Wachovia campus." The last renovation had taken place in the 1970s. The new project involved moving some employees temporarily to the BellSouth building and other locations, the bank returned to the building in Spring 2006. In May 2006, it was repainted from beige to gray to complement the renovated color scheme at the neighboring Wachovia Main. On October 12, 2006, the bank's new flagship branch opened on the ground floor.

The Charlotte Masonic Temple at 329 S Tryon St. was already on the corner of South Tryon and Third Street when Union National Bank built the shorter building.  It was built in 1915 for $122,750.  The building was designed by architect C. C. Hook to be Egyptian-Revival architecture.  In 1937 a fire gutted the building and it seemed like a total loss.  However, it 1938 it was restored and rededicated.  In 1985, First Union bought the Masonic Temple.  Then in 1987 it was demolished.  The former property is now occupied by Wells Fargo Plaza.  The two massive columns of the building façade are now on display on Dave Lyle Blvd. in Rock Hill, SC.  

In 1998 First Union began considering building a 72-story building on the plaza to house additional employees in Uptown.  Even with the construction of the Three First Union Center the company still didn't think they would have enough space.  The project was tentatively called Four First Union. However, the plans for the new tower were putting on hold indefinitely in September 1999 due to the company's poor performance on the stock market.

See also
 List of tallest buildings in Charlotte
List of tallest buildings in North Carolina

References

External links

 Emporis

Skyscraper office buildings in Charlotte, North Carolina
Office buildings completed in 1971
Wells Fargo buildings